Jai Chandiram (26 December 1937 – 11 May 2013) was a veteran media person and the former deputy director general of Doordarshan. She contributed greatly to the use of media in education and was instrumental in introducing its use at premier institutes like Central Institute of Education – NCERT, Indira Gandhi Open University (IGNOU), and the Asia Pacific Institute for Broadcasting and Development (AIBD) in Kuala Lumpur, among various other institutions.

Education
Teacher's Training Diploma, Lady Irwin College, New Delhi, 1957; Studied Drama and Radio at Briarcliff College, New York; Bachelor’s of Science majoring in Broadcasting Television, School of Journalism and Communications University of Florida, Gainesville, Florida, 1961; Jai received her master's degree from the School of Journalism and Communications, University of Florida, Gainesville, 1966.

Career
Jai began her career as a producer in Doordarshan at the age of 24 in 1961, two years after the Television Division of the All India Radio was started. She worked as a temporary hand who was given charge of setting up India's school television broadcasts. She was one of the first TV professionals who had no radio background. Her main concerns were gender imbalance issues, children's education and distance learning. Since she had no predecessors to learn from at Doordarshan, her career was an inimitable journey in innovation. Doordarshan had a large audience base, and Jai looked at details, both big and small, to ensure that the programs were visually appealing and intellectually stimulating.

Later she would describe the extent of improvisation which was the norm: figuring out the exact 20-minute period when the light coming through the studio window was just right to go through the prism and demonstrate VIBGYOR, and supplementing studio lights for other programming with lights borrowed from her uncle’s car workshop."

In the mid 1970s, she worked for the Satellite Instructional Television Experiment in Ahmedabad (SITE), which took television to Indian village schools.

Jai was also a part-time actress off-Broadway and donned several other roles with apparent ease. Several of her admirers were impressed with her "grasp of issues and networking skills".

She was a jury member at NHK (Japan) and the IAWRT Awards.

List of positions held 
President of the International Association of Women in Radio and Television(IAWRT) and founder and Managing Trustee, IAWRT – India Chapter.
Head of the television department at the Central Institute of Education of the National Council for Educational Research and Training(NCERT)
Head of the department of television at the Film and Television Institute, Pune
Head of the Fortune Institute of Information and Television (FICT)
Advisor at the Delhi International Arts Festival
Media consultant(Television) at the Asia Pacific Institute for Broadcasting and Development, (AIBD), Kuala Lumpur
Head of the Educational Media Production Center of Indira Gandhi National Open University (EMPC-IGNOU)
Executive director, Media, at the Indira Gandhi National Center for the Arts (IGNCA)
Advisor to the Government of Andhra Pradesh for the cluster of channels focussing on education, named Mana TV
Director of Doordarshan, Delhi
Director of Doordarshan, Ahmedabad
Director of Doordarshan, Central Production Centre
Examiner for the Jamia Millia Institute for Mass Communication
Commonwealth of Learning Consultant and trainer for National Institute of Teachers (NIT) and NOUN, Nigeria
Worked with Ammu Joseph to study the training of Sri Lankan journalists, for UNESCO
Consultant for the Princess Diana Leprosy Mission Trust
Media Advisor, DEP-SSA IGNOU

Other traits
Jai was a confident and inspiring woman who took bold steps with little regard to repercussions from powerful circles. She was given a punitive transfer when she demanded written requests from politicians who requested broadcasts of a personal nature, such as covering the tonsuring ceremonies of their grandchildren.

She was deeply concerned about women's rights and was involved with the IAWRT Asian Women's Film Festival which provides a platform for women film makers to focus on gender issues.

Awards and Distinctions
First Asian president of IAWRT
Recipient of the IAWRT Lifetime Achievement Award

References

1937 deaths
2013 deaths
Doordarshan
Indian television executives